Travis Varcoe (born 10 April 1988) is a retired Australian rules footballer who played in the Australian Football League (AFL) for the Geelong Football Club from 2006 to 2014 and for the Collingwood Football Club from 2015 to 2020. He currently serves as an assistant coach for the Western Bulldogs.

Career
Varcoe debuted in the South Australian National Football League (SANFL) for the Central District Football Club in 2005 at the age of 17. A foot injury early in the season held him back from performing in front of prospective recruiters, before Geelong selected him at the end of the first round with the 15th overall pick in the 2005 National Draft.

Geelong

Varcoe was given the honour of wearing Geelong's number five guernsey, previously worn by club legends Gary Ablett and Polly Farmer. Varcoe plays as a forward pocket but can also play as a midfielder if required, drawing comparisons to Melbourne speedster Aaron Davey, with his consistent forwardline pressure and high-speed chase downs on the field. Varcoe is often referred to as "The Magician" with his quick, at times invisible handballs and tricky skills.

Varcoe played a key utility role for Geelong in 2009, which included a valuable contribution in the Grand Final as Geelong defeated the St Kilda Football Club. Varcoe played a critical role in delivering a handball to Paul Chapman late in the game which resulted in a brilliant Chapman goal, giving Geelong a six-point lead. Shortly after, team mate Max Rooke scored a goal after the final siren to give Geelong a 12-point win.

Going into the 2010 AFL season, Varcoe put in the most promising preseason of his career, only to succumb to a thumb injury that put him out for the first few weeks of the season. However, on his return to the senior side, Varcoe played well enough to finish ninth in Geelong's 2010 best and fairest count.

Varcoe kicked the first goal of the 2011 AFL Grand Final inside the first 10 seconds of the match. He also kicked the second goal of the match, however his goal at the eight-minute mark in the 4th quarter was possibly goal of the season. Before kicking the goal Varcoe took a mark in Geelong's backline whilst he was almost simultaneously bumped, forcing the ball free and the mark going unpaid. However Varcoe then ran forward with the play, gathering possessions and ultimately converting a goal from inside 50 moments later. He would pick up his 2nd premiership medallion, as Geelong won by 38 points. As of Round 11, 2015, Varcoe had played in 149 games and, of those 149 games, had won 122 of those games. He was also the quickest player to reach 100 wins, playing in his 100th win in his 113th game.

Collingwood
On 15 October 2014, Varcoe was traded to the Collingwood Football Club in a three-way trade between Collingwood, Geelong and Melbourne which also saw Mitch Clark and Heritier Lumumba find new clubs. Despite being considered past his best during his last year at Geelong, Varcoe has enjoyed a renaissance of form since moving to Collingwood, playing arguably the best football of his career. Varcoe was considered one of the best recruits of the 2015 season.

After Collingwood was eliminated from the 2020 AFL finals series, Varcoe announced his retirement from football.

Personal life
In August 2007, Varcoe caused controversy after concerns were raised about the racial and sexual content featured on his MySpace page. The Geelong Football Club acted swiftly, removing the content immediately after it came to its attention.

Varcoe's sister Maggie died in August 2018 following an on-field collision whilst playing for Angle Vale Football Club in the Adelaide Footy League Grand Final. Travis continued to play for Collingwood in the weeks after her death as a tribute to her. The design of Collingwood 2019 Indigenous guernsey was inspired by Maggie and was designed by Travis' sister in law.

Statistics
Statistics are correct to the end of the 2020 season

|-
|- style="background-color: #eaeaea"
! scope="row" style="text-align:center" | 2006
|style="text-align:center;"|
| 5 || 0 || — || — || — || — || — || — || — || — || — || — || — || — || — || —
|-
|- 
! scope="row" style="text-align:center" | 2007
|style="text-align:center;"|
| 5 || 18 || 15 || 7 || 72 || 72 || 144 || 35 || 57 || 0.8 || 0.4 || 4.0 || 4.0 || 8.0 || 1.9 || 3.2
|- style="background-color: #eaeaea"
! scope="row" style="text-align:center" | 2008
|style="text-align:center;"|
| 5 || 16 || 14 || 7 || 98 || 87 || 185 || 45 || 72 || 0.9 || 0.4 || 6.1 || 5.4 || 11.6 || 2.8 || 4.5
|- 
! scope="row" style="text-align:center" | 2009
|style="text-align:center;"|
| 5 || 22 || 22 || 14 || 140 || 173 || 313 || 65 || 75 || 1.0 || 0.6 || 6.4 || 7.9 || 14.2 || 3.0 || 3.4
|- style="background-color: #eaeaea"
! scope="row" style="text-align:center" | 2010
|style="text-align:center;"|
| 5 || 20 || 31 || 13 || 146 || 174 || 320 || 72 || 82 || 1.6 || 0.7 || 7.3 || 8.7 || 16.0 || 3.6 || 4.1
|-
! scope="row" style="text-align:center" | 2011
|style="text-align:center;"|
| 5 || 24 || 31 || 17 || 187 || 202 || 389 || 57 || 51 || 1.3 || 0.7 || 7.8 || 8.4 || 16.2 || 2.4 || 2.1
|- style="background-color: #eaeaea"
! scope="row" style="text-align:center" | 2012
|style="text-align:center;"|
| 5 || 1 || 0 || 0 || 1 || 1 || 2 || 0 || 1 || 0.0 || 0.0 || 1.0 || 1.0 || 2.0 || 0.0 || 1.0
|- 
! scope="row" style="text-align:center" | 2013
|style="text-align:center;"|
| 5 || 14 || 8 || 6 || 74 || 95 || 169 || 25 || 59 || 0.6 || 0.4 || 5.3 || 6.8 || 12.1 || 1.8 || 4.2
|- style="background-color: #eaeaea"
! scope="row" style="text-align:center" | 2014
|style="text-align:center;"|
| 5 || 18 || 8 || 6 || 113 || 152 || 265 || 52 || 68 || 0.4 || 0.3 || 6.3 || 8.4 || 14.7 || 2.9 || 3.8
|- 
! scope="row" style="text-align:center" | 2015
|style="text-align:center;"|
| 18 || 22 || 10 || 10 || 185 || 193 || 378 || 90 || 89 || 0.5 || 0.5 || 8.4 || 8.8 || 17.2 || 4.1 || 4.0
|- style="background-color: #eaeaea"
! scope="row" style="text-align:center" | 2016
|style="text-align:center;"|
| 18 || 17 || 6 || 13 || 128 || 124 || 252 || 69 || 73 || 0.4 || 0.8 || 7.5 || 7.3 || 14.8 || 4.1 || 4.3
|- 
! scope="row" style="text-align:center" | 2017
|style="text-align:center;"|
| 18 || 8 || 2 || 1 || 49 || 60 || 109 || 25 || 19 || 0.3 || 0.1 || 6.1 || 7.5 || 13.6 || 3.1 || 2.4
|- style="background-color: #eaeaea"
! scope="row" style="text-align:center" | 2018
|style="text-align:center;"|
| 18 || 20 || 13 || 7 || 127 || 110 || 237 || 42 || 62 || 0.7 || 0.4 || 6.4 || 5.5 || 11.9 || 2.1 || 3.1
|- 
! scope="row" style="text-align:center" | 2019
|style="text-align:center;"|
| 18 || 16 || 9 || 6 || 94 || 105 || 199 || 59 || 42 || 0.6 || 0.4 || 5.9 || 6.6 || 12.4 || 3.7 || 2.6
|- style="background-color: #eaeaea"
! scope="row" style="text-align:center" | 2020
|style="text-align:center;"|
| 18 || 9 || 1 || 2 || 54 || 42 || 96 || 21 || 15 || 0.1 || 0.2 || 6.0 || 4.7 || 10.7 || 2.3 || 1.7
|- class="sortbottom"
! colspan=3| Career
! 230
! 171
! 109
! 1506
! 1641
! 3147
! 674
! 785
! 0.7
! 0.5
! 6.5
! 7.1
! 13.7
! 2.9
! 3.4
|}

References

External links

1988 births
Living people
Geelong Football Club players
Geelong Football Club Premiership players
Collingwood Football Club players
Australian rules footballers from Geelong
Indigenous Australian players of Australian rules football
Central District Football Club players
Australian rules footballers from South Australia
Australia international rules football team players
I'm a Celebrity...Get Me Out of Here! (Australian TV series) participants
Two-time VFL/AFL Premiership players